Andreea Roxana Acatrinei (born 7 April 1992) is a Romanian artistic gymnast. She won a bronze medal with the Romanian team at the 2008 Summer Olympics.

References

External links
 
 Andreea Acatrinei Unofficial Fan Site (Romanian)
 Andreea Acatrinei photos

1992 births
Living people
Romanian female artistic gymnasts
Gymnasts at the 2008 Summer Olympics
Olympic gymnasts of Romania
Olympic bronze medalists for Romania
Sportspeople from Brașov
Olympic medalists in gymnastics
Medalists at the 2008 Summer Olympics
21st-century Romanian women